Quintus Sulpicius Camerinus Cornutus ( 490–488 BC) was a Roman politician, and consul in 490 BC.

Family
He was a member of the gens Sulpicia, specifically he was among the Sulpicii Camerini. His father Servius Sulpicius Camerinus Cornutus (consul 500 BC) was the first consul of the Sulpicii, which may have taken its name from the town of Cameria or Camerium in Latium, and his son Servius Sulpicius Camerinus Cornutus was consul in 461 BC, and decemvir in 451 BC.

Career
In 490 BC, Cornutus was consul with Spurius Larcius. Dionysius of Halicarnassus ascribes many odd occurrences to their consulship, such as the birth of monstrosities, and people hearing voices. Then he tells of a pestilence that mostly killed cattle, but not many people.

In 488 BC, the Volsci under Coriolanus marched on Rome and besieged the city. Cornutus, and his former colleague Lartius, were among the ambassadors sent to intercede with Coriolanus.

References

Sources
 
 

5th-century BC Roman consuls
Camerinus Cornutus, Quintus